This article summarizes the events, album releases, and album release dates in hip hop music for the year 2009.

Events

January 
 Eminem, 50 Cent and Dr. Dre's new song "Crack a Bottle" has leaked on the internet. The song will be featured on Eminem's Relapse as a track not a single. It later reached number one.
 Jermaine Dupri has split from Def Jam.
 Bun B stated there would one last album by UGK titled 4 Life.  Bun B stated that the album would have 12 tracks and no guest appearances.
 Lupe Fiasco, last year stated he would be retiring and ending his career with a 3 disc album entitled LupE.N.D but now he said he is not going to retire instead, he's planning to release three albums over the next year and a half.

February 
 Soulja Boy and Bow Wow start a small feud. They both release diss tracks, but later end it.
 50 Cent and Rick Ross began trading insults on various diss tracks.
 For the first time in four years, The Game says he sides with 50 Cent in a beef; continuing to state that Rick Ross needs to ring him so he can help Ross out of the career ending mess he has become involved in with 50 Cent.
 Lil Wayne won 4 Grammy Awards at the 2009 Grammy Awards, followed by Kanye West winning 2 awards and Jay-Z and T.I. winning one each.
 Deonta Cummings is filing a suit against Jim Jones and E1 Records alleging that his artist, Ivory Keys, was not given proper compensation or credit for his contribution to the album Jim Jones & Skull Gang Present A Tribute To Bad Santa Starring Mike Epps.
 Lil Wayne's Tha Carter III sold 3 million copies.
 Lil Wayne sued for $1.3 Million caused by canceling New York shows.
 Flo Rida breaks a digital sales record, by selling over 630,000 digital units of his single "Right Round" in one week.
 Eminem sues Universal Music over digital royalties.
 Upcoming rap artist Drake comes out with mixtape named So Far Gone spawning the six hit singles Best I Ever Had, Say Something, Brand New, Houstatlantavegas, Forever, and Uptown.

March 
 Snoop Dogg joins the Nation of Islam.
 Eminem plans to release two albums in this year.
 50 Cent also plans to release two albums this year and joins Fall Out Boy in their tour.
 Rapper B.o.B changes his stage name to Bobby Ray.
 R.O.O.T.S. the second album from Flo Rida leaks onto the internet on March 24.
 T.I. is sentenced to go to jail for 1 year and a day for gun possessions. He will go to federal prison sometime after May 19 for trying to purchase machine guns, ammunition, and silencers in October 2007.
 New Jack City II the last album from Bow Wow leaks onto the internet.
 Cam'ron says there will not be a Dipset reunion.

April 
 Jadakiss releases his third studio album, The Last Kiss.
 Cash Money Records are suing mixtape DJs including DJ Drama
 Bone Thugs-n-Harmony member Flesh-n-Bone got picked up on gun possession charges in Santa Clarita, California according to TMZ.
 Ludacris signed rapper Lil Scrappy to his Disturbing tha Peace imprint.
 Jim Jones was arrested in New Jersey, on an outstanding warrant, all while giving followers on his Twitter page updates during the incident.
 Eminem releases his first official single in 2 years, "We Made You" off his highly anticipated album Relapse.
 Cam'ron says he and Jim Jones are done on Hot 97.
 Bow Wow announces that he is dismissing himself from the rap game, because he feels there is no more to be done on the music side.
 Asher Roth's Asleep in the Bread Aisle & Rick Ross' Deeper Than Rap leaked onto the internet before their official release.

May 
 The Smoking Gun a website that posts legal documents, arrest records, and police mugshots on a daily basis, exposes Cedric "Alfamega" Zellars, as his last job being a DEA informant.
 T.I. drops Alfamega from Grand Hustle Records.
 DMX is released from prison in Arizona.
 Jermaine Dupri, Nelly, Usher, Bryan-Michael Cox, Johntá Austin, Trey Songz & Tyrone Davis form a Hip-Hop/R&B Supergroup, known as Ocean's 7.
 Method Man and Joe Budden start beefing.
 Rapper/producer Swizz Beatz admitted to having a relationship with Alicia Keys.
 Atlanta-based rapper Dolla was shot dead at the Beverly Hills Center on May 18.
 Jay-Z officially leaves Def Jam Records.
 T.I. checked into a federal prison in Forrest City, Arkansas on Tuesday (May 26). The rapper is serving a 366-day federal prison sentence for attempting to buy illegal machine guns and silencers from undercover agents in October 2007.
 Eminem becomes the highest selling artist of 2009 so far with the release of Relapse.
 Rapper Tega, known for being a member of Nelly's St. Lunatics crew, died May 27 from injuries he sustained after being shot on May 16.Huffington Post notice of Henderson's death
 Rapper DJ Paul releases his first solo album in 7 years. Guests includes Lord Infamous

 June 
 Jay-Z announces he will release The Blueprint³ September 11, 2009.
 50 Cent releases a mixtape called War Angel LP and says "it's the best body of work I put out in the mixtape circuit".
 Plies throws $50,000 into the concert crowd at the 107.9 FM Birthday Bash at Philips Arena to promote his single "Plenty Money".
 Legendary graffiti artist Iz the Wiz dies.
Michael Jackson dies at the age of 50.
 Daz Dillinger disses Jermaine Dupri, Suge Knight and Alan Grumblatt.
 The Game ends beef with 50 Cent on Michael Jackson tribute song Better on the Other Side.

 July 
 The Game apologizes to 50 Cent and Interscope.
 Alfamega announces he is still signed to Grand Hustle. His manager Reek Walker says "We never received any documentation. Technically, Alfa is still a member of Grand Hustle. T.I. can denounce him all he wants, but as long as that contract is in [place], he's still there."
 BET has expressed remorse over a performance by Lil Wayne, Drake and Young Money Entertainment that involved underage girls during songs "Best I Ever Had" and "Every Girl".
 The death of Michael Jackson inspires Mase's return to music.
 Jay-Z becomes hip hop's biggest earner topping the 2009 Forbes Hip-Hop Cash Kings List.
 Red City Entertainment sues Lil Wayne for not appearing at a concert in the Bahamas, which they paid $432,000 up front for him to appear.
 The Game leaks out a diss track aiming at Jay-Z.
 Soulja Boy Tell Em attempts to end beef with New Boyz
 Rakim makes an official comeback and releases his first single, "Holy Are You", off his upcoming third solo studio album The Seventh Seal; ten years after his 1999 album The Master.
Fabolous's fifth studio album Loso's Way leaks onto the internet a week before its official release.
Jermaine Dupri and Janet Jackson split up after a seven-year relationship
Pitbull launches a new website blog at planetpit.com.
Eminem leaks a diss track aimed at Mariah Carey and Nick Cannon in response to Mariah Carey's "Obsessed".
Fat Joe announces on Twitter that his album Jealous Ones Still Envy 2 (J.O.S.E. 2) will be released on October 6, 2009. He comes out with a second single for the album, Aloha.
The final Big Pun recordings are announced to be released in September, with the DVD release of Big Pun: The Legacy.
Young Jeezy disses DJ Drama in XXL Magazine; Drama responds on Twitter.
Cam'ron announces that he will expand his record label under the new company U.N., and will launch Dipset West.
The company who created the Auto-Tune, Antares Audio Technologies, said that since the release of Jay-Z's single D.O.A. (Death of Auto-Tune), the Auto-tune sales have increased.
Baatin of Slum Village dies, July 31, 2009.

 August 
Hell Rell blames Jim Jones for Dipset falling apart.
The Game and others are sued by Robert Kirkwood, for fighting at a family funeral.
Chamillionaire releases the final mixtape in the Mixtape Messiah Series, Mixtape Messiah 7.
Joe Budden attacked by Raekwon and his crew.
C-Murder sentenced to life in prison for murder.
Bow Wow signs with Cash Money Records.
Pitbull received the key to his home-city of Miami.
Adam Goldstein a club disc jockey better known as DJ AM died of an accidental drug overdose August 28.

 September 
Harlem-based rapper Max B was sentenced to 75 years in prison September 3 for his role in a botched robbery that led to a double murder in a Fort Lee, New Jersey hotel.
On September 8, 50 Cent & Robert Greene released their book "The 50th Law".
On September 13, 2009, while Taylor Swift presented her speech in winning Best Female Video at the 2009 MTV Video Music Awards, Kanye West interrupted her speech and stated that Beyoncé had a better video.  His outburst received negative reaction from the audience and he was removed from the award show.  He later apologized.
Jay-Z and Alicia Keys performed "Empire State of Mind" at the 2009 MTV Video Music Awards.  Towards the end of performing, Lil Mama jumped onstage.
Rapper/producer Kia Shine stated he co-wrote "Best I Ever Had" with Drake and has of 25% ownership of the song, at the BMI awards; but Drake later denied this on his blog.
DJ, turntablist & producer, Roc Raida died on September 19.
Rapper Lil Boosie was sentenced to two years in prison for gun and marijuana possession. He could serve as little as one year depending on his behavior in prison.
Charles Hamilton was released from Interscope Records on September 19.
New York-based rapper N.O.R.E. releases a video blog saying he doesn't support S.O.R.E., an album that hit stores on September 15 that was supposedly released by him.
 Chamillionaire announces his third studio album, Venom, to be released on February 2, 2010

 October 
DJ, Mr. Magic dies of a heart attack.
Wu-Tang Clan's Method Man, was arrested October 5 for tax evasion.
Jim Jones pleaded guilty on October 5 in a New York courtroom to a misdemeanor assault charge – a result of an altercation involving a member of singer Ne-Yo's entourage last December.
 Chamillionaire released the first single, "Good Morning", from his upcoming album on iTunes
 Lil Wayne pleads guilty to gun charges from his 2007 arrest and could face up 8 months to 1 year in prison.
Rapper Jamal "Shyne" Barrow was released from prison after serving almost nine years for his role in a violent nightclub shooting in 1999 involving Bad Boy mogul Sean "Diddy" Combs and his ex-girlfriend, Jennifer Lopez. He was deported to Belize the next day.

 November 
Gucci Mane is sentenced to 12 months in jail for violating probation.
Lil Boosie has his sentence doubled to 4 years for marijuana and gun charges.
Beanie Sigel as well as 50 Cent, has ignited a beef with Jay-Z.

 December 
 Young Jeezy has squashed his beef with DJ Drama as well as Gucci Mane.
 Jim Jones leaves Columbia Records and stays at E1.
Long-awaited Lil Wayne album, Rebirth leaks 2 months before release.Billboard names The Neptunes "Producers Of Decade".Entertainment Weekly named Kid Cudi's Man on the Moon: The End of Day'' the best Hip-Hop Album of 2009.
T.I. was released three months early from prison and was admitted into a halfway house in his hometown of Atlanta.
Following the burglary in his St. Louis mansion, Nelly offers a cash reward for information leading to the arrest of the housebreaker.
Trina made an appearance at Minnesota Vikings tackle Bryant McKinnie's birthday party and while on stage took shots at rapper Khia.

Albums

Highest-charting singles

Highest first week sales

As of December 31, 2009.

Highest critically reviewed albums (Metacritic)

See also
Previous article: 2008 in hip hop music
Next article: 2010 in hip hop music

References

2000s in hip hop music
Hip hop
Hip hop music by year